Kim Bo-kyung (or  ; born 6 October 1989) is a South Korean professional footballer who plays as a midfielder for Korean club Suwon Samsung Bluewings.

Club career

Cerezo Osaka
In 2010, Kim dropped out of Hongik University and signed a three-year contract for J1 League side Cerezo Osaka. After he was loaned out to J. League Division 2 side Oita Trinita for the 2010 season, he returned to Cerezo Osaka. During the 2011 season, Kim scored 8 goals. In 2012, while Levir Culpi resigned and Cerezo Osaka appointed Sérgio Soares as the new manager, he remained a key player for the team, scoring 7 goals in 15 matches. When he left the team to participate in the 2012 Summer Olympics, he was the fourth leading goal scorer in J1 League.

Cardiff City

On 10 July 2012, his agents confirmed that his club Cerezo Osaka, had entered talks with Welsh Championship side Cardiff City over a possible transfer. On 12 July, Cardiff City and Cerezo Osaka agreed to a fee believed to be around £2.5 million. The deal was completed on 27 July, when Kim signed a three-year deal. He made his debut on 18 September in a 2–0 win over Millwall coming on for Craig Noone. Kim's first start for Cardiff came against Burnley in a 4–0 win at Cardiff City Stadium on 27 October. Kim scored his first goal for Cardiff in their 4–1 victory over Blackburn Rovers on 7 December. His second was the opening goal at Blackpool in a 2–1 victory for Cardiff on 19 January.

On 17 April 2013, Cardiff City won the Championship title and were promoted to the Premier League, making Kim the 12th Premier League player from Korea. He scored his first Premier League goal against Manchester United on 24 November 2013, to secure a late 2–2 home draw with an injury time headed equaliser.

On 24 January 2015, Cardiff City announced Kim's contract had been terminated by mutual consent.

Wigan Athletic
On 6 February 2015, Wigan Athletic announced that Kim agreed a contract until the end of 2014–15 season. After his contract expired, local rivals Blackburn Rovers tried to sign him, but Kim failed to get a work permit.

Jeonbuk Hyundai Motors
At the 2016 FIFA Club World Cup, Kim scored once against America and once against Mamelodi FC.

International career
Kim's international career began in 2009 as a member of the South Korea U-20. He participated in the 2009 FIFA U-20 World Cup, scoring 2 goals in 4 matches. After the U-20 World Cup, he was selected by Hong Myung-Bo, then the head coach of the South Korea U-23 team.

On 9 January 2010, Kim made his first international appearance for South Korea in a friendly match against Zambia and participated in the 2010 World Cup later that year. He scored his first and second goals on 12 June 2012, in a World Cup qualifying match against Lebanon.

Kim was included in Hong's squad for the 2012 Summer Olympics and contributed to winning the bronze medal. He scored the winning goal against Switzerland via a spectacular left-foot volley shot and helped his side advance to the knockout stage. He was also included in the team of the tournament for his outstanding performances.

Career statistics

Club
.

International goals
Scores and results list South Korea's goal tally first.

Honours

Club
Cardiff City
Football League Championship: 2012–13

Jeonbuk Hyundai Motors
AFC Champions League: 2016
K League 1 (2): 2020, 2021
KFA Cup: 2020

Country
South Korea U-23
Asian Games bronze medal: 2010
Summer Olympics bronze medal: 2012

South Korea
EAFF E-1 Football Championship: 2019

Individual
K League 1 Best XI: 2019
K League 1 Most Valuable Player: 2019
K League 1 top assist provider: 2021

References

External links
 Profile at Kashiwa Reysol

 Kim Bo-kyung – National Team stats at KFA 
 
 
 

1989 births
Living people
Association football midfielders
South Korean footballers
South Korea international footballers
South Korean expatriate footballers
South Korean expatriate sportspeople in the United Kingdom
South Korean expatriate sportspeople in Wales
Expatriate footballers in Wales
South Korean expatriate sportspeople in England
Expatriate footballers in England
South Korean expatriate sportspeople in Japan
Expatriate footballers in Japan
2010 FIFA World Cup players
2011 AFC Asian Cup players
Oita Trinita players
Cerezo Osaka players
Cardiff City F.C. players
Wigan Athletic F.C. players
Matsumoto Yamaga FC players
Jeonbuk Hyundai Motors players
Kashiwa Reysol players
Ulsan Hyundai FC players
J1 League players
J2 League players
English Football League players
Premier League players
K League 1 players
2014 FIFA World Cup players
Footballers at the 2012 Summer Olympics
Olympic footballers of South Korea
Olympic medalists in football
Olympic bronze medalists for South Korea
Medalists at the 2012 Summer Olympics
Asian Games medalists in football
Footballers at the 2010 Asian Games
Asian Games bronze medalists for South Korea
Medalists at the 2010 Asian Games
South Korean Buddhists
Sportspeople from South Jeolla Province